The 2022–23 Grand Canyon Antelopes men's basketball team represented Grand Canyon University during the 2022–23 NCAA Division I men's basketball season. They were led by head coach Bryce Drew in his third season. The Antelopes play their home games at GCU Arena in Phoenix, Arizona as members of the Western Athletic Conference. They finished the season 24–12, 11–7 in WAC Play to finish in a three-way tie for fourth place. They defeated UT Arlington, Seattle U, Sam Houston, and Southern Utah to win the WAC tournament. They received the conference’s automatic bid to the NCAA tournament where they lost in the first round to Gonzaga.

Previous season 
The 2021–22 Antelopes finished fourth in the WAC regular season and lost in the semifinals of the 2022 WAC men's basketball tournament.

Roster

Schedule and results 

|-
!colspan=12 style=| Exhibition

|-
!colspan=12 style=| Non-conference regular season

|-
!colspan=9 style=|WAC tournament

|-
!colspan=12 style=}| NCAA tournament

Source

See also 
2022–23 Grand Canyon Antelopes women's basketball team

References 

Grand Canyon Antelopes men's basketball seasons
Grand Canyon
Grand Canyon Antelopes men's basketball
Grand Canyon Antelopes men's basketball
Grand Canyon